The Call of the Sea is a 1919 British silent drama film directed by H. Grenville-Taylor and starring Henry Victor, Booth Conway and Stella Muir.

References

Bibliography
 Palmer, Scott. British Film Actors' Credits, 1895-1987. McFarland, 1998.

External links
 

1919 films
1919 drama films
British drama films
British silent feature films
British black-and-white films
1910s English-language films
1910s British films
Silent drama films